Glaciecola pallidula is a psychrophilic bacteria found in Antarctic sea-ice habitats, being the type species of its genus. It is pigmented, psychrophilic, and a strictly aerobic chemoheterotroph. Its type strain is (ACAM 615T).

References

Further reading
Yumoto, Isao, ed. Cold-adapted Microorganisms. Horizon Scientific Press, 2013.

External links
LPSN
Type strain of Glaciecola pallidula at BacDive -  the Bacterial Diversity Metadatabase

Alteromonadales
Bacteria described in 1998